Derrycunihy was the name of a number of ships operated by McCowan & Gross Ltd, including:

, sunk during the Normandy Landings
, in service from 1946–52

Ship names